Chelsea Manor House was once the demesne of the main manor of the medieval parish now roughly commensurate with the district of Chelsea, London. It was a residence acquired by Henry VIII of England in 1536, and was the site of two subsequent houses. Today, the area is covered by residential streets.

Owner-occupiers
Chelsea was granted to Queen Catherine Parr for life in 1544 as part of her jointure. In 1548, she died at Sudeley and in her will she left everything to her fourth husband, Thomas Seymour.

It was home to Elizabeth I of England, as Princess, between 1536 and 1548, and then to Anne of Cleves, who died there in 1557. Other famous owners included James Hamilton, 1st Duke of Hamilton, Charles Cheyne, 1st Viscount Newhaven, Sir Hans Sloane, the Bishops of Winchester. Three houses in turn existed, the last of which was demolished in 1825 by Earl Cadogan and replaced with fashionable residential streets - the Cadogan family and its enterprises have kept ownership of some of these properties.

External links
History of Chelsea Manor

Buildings and structures demolished in 1825
Former buildings and structures in the Royal Borough of Kensington and Chelsea
Demolished buildings and structures in London